The men's 1500 metre freestyle at the 2007 World Aquatics Championships was held on the morning of 31 March (heats) and the evening of 1 April (final) at Rod Laver Arena in Melbourne, Australia. 50 swimmers were entered in the event, of which 47 swam.

The existing records at the start of the event were:
World record (WR): 14:34.56, Grant Hackett (Australia), 29 July 2001, Fukuoka, Japan
Championship record (CR): same

Results

Final

Heats
"Q" marks those swimmers who qualified for finals.

DNS= Did not swim

See also
Swimming at the 2005 World Aquatics Championships – Men's 1500 metre freestyle
Swimming at the 2008 Summer Olympics – Men's 1500 metre freestyle
Swimming at the 2009 World Aquatics Championships – Men's 1500 metre freestyle

References

Men's 1500m Freestyle Preliminary results from the 2007 World Championships. Published by OmegaTiming.com (official timer of the '07 Worlds); retrieved 2009-06-29.
Men's 1500m Freestyle Final results from the 2007 World Championships. Published by OmegaTiming.com (official timer of the '07 Worlds); retrieved 2009-06-29.

Swimming at the 2007 World Aquatics Championships